St Edmund Arrowsmith Catholic High School is the name of two schools named after Edmund Arrowsmith:

St Edmund Arrowsmith Catholic High School, Ashton-in-Makerfield
St Edmund Arrowsmith Catholic Academy, Whiston (formerly St Edmund Arrowsmith Catholic High School)